Taungthonton is a large inactive stratovolcano in the Sagaing Region and Kachin, northern Myanmar. There have been no recorded eruptions associated with this volcano although it is evidence of convergence between the Indian Plate and the Burma Plate.

References 

Volcanoes of Myanmar
Mountains of Myanmar
Mandalay Region
Inactive volcanoes
Geography of Kachin State